Čapek's Tales is a 1947 Czechoslovak drama film directed by Martin Frič, based on 5 short detective stories by Karel Čapek.  It was nominated for the Grand International Award at the Venice Film Festival, 1947.

Cast
 Jaroslav Průcha as Zedník Zaruba
 Jaroslav Marvan as Bartosek, Police Superintendent and narrator
 Lída Chválová as Paní Landová
 František Kovařík as Juraj Cup
 Vladimír Šmeral as Ferdinand Kugler
 František Smolík as Starec, witness
 František Filipovský as Police Agent Pistora
 Paľo Bielik as Police Chief Havelka
 Theodor Pištěk as Karel Hampl
 Antonie Nedošinská as Mary
 Gustav Hilmar as Senate President

References

External links
 

1947 films
1947 drama films
1940s Czech-language films
Czech black-and-white films
Czechoslovak black-and-white films
Films directed by Martin Frič
Czechoslovak drama films
Adaptations of works by Karel Čapek
1940s Czech films
Czech anthology films